The 2020 Lima Challenger was a professional tennis tournament played on clay courts. It was the fourteenth edition of the tournament which was part of the 2020 ATP Challenger Tour. It took place in Lima, Peru between 23 and 29 November 2020.

Singles main-draw entrants

Seeds

 1 Rankings are as of 16 November 2020.

Other entrants
The following players received wildcards into the singles main draw:
  Conner Huertas del Pino
  Nicolás Jarry
  Jorge Panta

The following player received entry into the singles main draw using a protected ranking:
  Íñigo Cervantes

The following player received entry into the singles main draw as a special exempt:
  Jesper de Jong

The following player received entry into the singles main draw as an alternate:
  Sadio Doumbia

The following players received entry from the qualifying draw:
  Gonzalo Lama
  Wilson Leite
  Vitaliy Sachko
  Thiago Agustín Tirante

The following players received entry as lucky losers:
  Collin Altamirano
  Mauricio Echazú
  Sergio Galdós
  Bastián Malla

Champions

Singles

  Daniel Elahi Galán def.  Thiago Agustín Tirante 6–1, 3–6, 6–3.

Doubles

  Íñigo Cervantes /  Oriol Roca Batalla def.  Collin Altamirano /  Vitaliy Sachko 6–3, 6–4.

References

2020 ATP Challenger Tour
2020
November 2020 sports events in South America
2020 in Peruvian sport